Oloori Roseline Omolara Osipitan is a Nigerian business executive and Yoruba princess. She serves as the president and chairperson of Independent Petroleum Marketers Association of Nigeria's Women Association and is the founder of First Royal Oil and Gas. She holds the chieftaincy title of the Yeye Oba of the Itori Kingdom.

Biography 
Oloori Roseline Osipitan was born in the Ondo State, Nigeria. Osipitan works as a business executive in the Nigerian oil industry, where she is one of the first women executives. She serves as the president and chairperson of the IPMAN Women Association, a female equivalent to the Independent Petroleum Marketers Association of Nigeria. Ospitian is the founder of the First Royal Oil and Gas company. She is married to Omoba Bola Osipitan and is the Yeye Oba of the Itori Kingdom.

References 

Living people
20th-century Nigerian businesswomen
20th-century Nigerian businesspeople
21st-century Nigerian businesswomen
21st-century Nigerian businesspeople
Nigerian women company founders
Nigerian businesspeople in the oil industry
Nigerian women business executives
Nigerian princesses
People from Ondo State
African queen mothers
Yoruba princesses
Yoruba women in business
Year of birth missing (living people)